Dagong may refer to the following places and institutions in China:

 Dagong Global Credit Rating
 Dalian University of Technology, Liaoning Province
 Dagong, Jiangsu, a town in Hai'an County, Jiangsu, China